Brian Battistone and Dann Battistone were the defending champions (while the tournament was part of the ITF Men's Circuit), but lost in quarterfinals to Martin Fischer and Philipp Oswald.

Phillip Simmonds and Tim Smyczek won the title by defeating Ryan Harrison and Michael Venus 2–6, 6–1, [10–4] in the final.

Seeds

Draw

Draw

References
 Main Draw (ATP)
 Qualifying Draw (ATP)

2008 ATP Challenger Series
2008 in American tennis
2008,Price LeBlanc Lexus Pro Tennis Classic,Doubles
2008 in sports in Louisiana
2008